Wyke and Norwood Green railway station served the villages of Wyke and Norwood Green in West Yorkshire, England.

History
Originally situated a little to the south west and named Pickle Bridge, it was opened in 1850, renamed Wyke in 1852 and moved to the final location in 1896.  It was closed to passengers by the British Transport Commission on 21 September 1953. 

A grade II listed building, called Junction House, still exists on the site and is used as a private house. According to Historic England it was a signalman's cottage and may have been part of the original station.

References

External links
 Wyke and Norwood Green station on navigable 1947 O. S. map

Disused railway stations in Bradford
Former Lancashire and Yorkshire Railway stations
Railway stations in Great Britain opened in 1850
Railway stations in Great Britain closed in 1953